Alci may refer to:

Alci Monastery, Ladakh (or Alchi), a Tibetan Buddhist complex
Alci the nearby village 
 "ALCI"  or "a/LCI", Angle-resolved low-coherence interferometry, a technique in biomedical imaging